Exelby, Leeming and Londonderry (formerly Exelby, Leeming and Newton) is a civil parish in the Hambleton District of North Yorkshire, England. It contains three villages – Exelby, Leeming and Londonderry – and RAF Leeming Royal Air Force station. The population of the civil parish as of the 2011 census was 2,788. The parish was renamed because it was felt that "Newton" was not recognised while Londonderry was, being a hamlet.

References

Civil parishes in North Yorkshire
Hambleton District